Sant Quintí may refer to:

 Sant Quintí de Mediona, Spain
 Sant Quintí de Puig-Rodon, Spain